The New Kids is the first compilation album by South Korean boy band iKON, released through YG Entertainment on January 7, 2019. It is a compilation of the 2017 single album New Kids: Begin, the 2018 album Return, the digital single "Rubber Band", and the EPs New Kids: Continue and New Kids: The Final. It features the lead single and only new track, "I'm OK".

This is the last iKON album to feature the appearance of member B.I before his departure in June 2019.

Background
YG Entertainment announced the album on Twitter on December 27, 2018, posting that the album would be available online from January 7, 2019, and as a physical version from January 8. It serves as a repackage and compilation of the other entries in the New Kids series, from 2017 to 2018.

Promotion
iKON played an encore concert in Seoul, where they debuted the single "I'm OK". Along with concerts in Japan, Australia, and other Asian countries, they also performed on the 2018 year-end music show MBC Gayo Daejejeon.

Track listing

Charts

References

2019 compilation albums
Korean-language albums
YG Entertainment albums
IKon albums